In mathematics, the Jacobi identity is a property of a binary operation that describes how the order of evaluation, the placement of parentheses in a multiple product, affects the result of the operation. By contrast, for operations with the associative property, any order of evaluation gives the same result (parentheses in a multiple product are not needed). The identity is named after the German mathematician Carl Gustav Jacob Jacobi.

The cross product  and the Lie bracket operation  both satisfy the Jacobi identity. In analytical mechanics, the Jacobi identity is satisfied by the Poisson brackets. In quantum mechanics, it is satisfied by operator commutators on a Hilbert space and equivalently in the phase space formulation of quantum mechanics by the Moyal bracket.

Definition 
The  is

Notice the pattern in the variables on the left side of this identity.

Commutator bracket form
The simplest informative example of a Lie algebra is constructed from the (associative) ring of  matrices, which may be thought of as infinitesimal motions of an n-dimensional vector space. The × operation is the commutator, which measures the failure of commutativity in matrix multiplication.

In that notation, the Jacobi identity is:

That is easily checked by computation.

Using the antisymmetry property , the Jacobi identity may be rewritten as a modification of the associative property:

There is also a plethora of graded Jacobi identities involving anticommutators , such as:

Adjoint form
Most common examples of the Jacobi identity come from the bracket multiplication  on Lie algebras and Lie rings. The Jacobi identity is written as:

 

Because the bracket multiplication is antisymmetric, the Jacobi identity admits two equivalent reformulations. Defining the adjoint operator , the identity becomes:

Thus, the Jacobi identity for Lie algebras states that the action of any element on the algebra is a derivation. That form of the Jacobi identity is also used to define the notion of Leibniz algebra.

Another rearrangement shows that the Jacobi identity is equivalent to the following identity between the operators of the adjoint representation:

There, the bracket on the left side is the operation of the original algebra, the bracket on the right is the commutator of the composition of operators, and the identity states that the  map sending each element to its adjoint action is a Lie algebra homomorphism.

Related identities 
The Hall–Witt identity is the analogous identity for the commutator operation in a group.

The following identity follows from anticommutativity and Jacobi identity and holds in arbitrary Lie algebra:

See also
Structure constants
 Super Jacobi identity
 Three subgroups lemma (Hall–Witt identity)

References

 .

External links 

Lie algebras
Mathematical identities
Non-associative algebra
Properties of binary operations